Expedition 32 was the 32nd long-duration expedition to the International Space Station (ISS). It began on 1 July 2012 with the departure from the ISS of the Soyuz TMA-03M spacecraft, which returned the Expedition 31 crew to Earth, and concluded on 16 September 2012 with the departure of Soyuz TMA-04M. The Soyuz craft returned to Earth on 17 September 2012 at 6:53am Moscow Standard Time when touchdown was officially recorded by the Russian Federal Space Agency.

Crew

Source NASA

References

External links

NASA's Space Station Expeditions page
Expedition 32 Photography

Expeditions to the International Space Station
2012 in spaceflight